Diamond City may refer to:
 Diamond City, Alberta
 Diamond City, Arkansas
 Diamond City, Montana (historic)
 Diamond City, North Carolina, an abandoned whaling village once the most populous on the Outer Banks
 Diamond City (Shopping Centers), Japan
 Diamond City, the fictional city where the WarioWare, Inc. video game series takes place
 Wilkes-Barre, Pennsylvania, known by its nickname "The Diamond City"
 Kimberley, Northern Cape in South Africa, is also known as "The Diamond City"
 Diamond City (film), 1949 British film
 Surat, India, known as "Diamond City"
 Diamond City, a town situated inside Fenway Park in the video game Fallout 4.